Patricia Chou is an American researcher who is affiliated with the National Institute on Alcohol Abuse and Alcoholism and the National Institute of Health. Chou was the executive director of the WHO/NIAAA Collaborative Emergency Room Study (CERS) for Asian Regions for many years. Her published research extend to fields such as alcohol and injury, national analysis of alcohol usage disorder, and the combined effects of alcohol, tobacco, and other recreational drugs.

Research 

Under the WHO/NIAAA CERS, Dr. Chou studied the association between yearlong episodic alcohol abuse and intentional or alcohol-related injuries. Chou looked towards data collected from injured patients in South Korea in 1989 and used mathematical models to analyze patient injuries and heavy alcohol intake. The results of her work demonstrated a positive correlation between patient injuries and heavy alcohol usage. Data showed that intentional injury among patients greatly increased past a 90 milliliter alcohol threshold. A practical result of Dr. Chou's research was the implementation of alcohol screening in Korea to determine the true degree of injury among patients and therefore create ranking order for treating patients.

References

Year of birth missing (living people)
Living people
Researchers in alcohol abuse